Aniek Nouwen (born 9 March 1999) is a Dutch professional footballer who plays as a defender for Italian side AC Milan, on loan from Women's Super League club Chelsea and the Netherlands national team.

Club career

PSV, 2016–2021 
Since 2016, Nouwen played professionally for PSV at the Eredivisie, where she recorded 69 appearances and 15 goals for the team. In 2017 and 2018, she and her team were runners-up of the KNVB Women's Cup, the cup competition for women's football in the Netherlands.

Chelsea, 2021– 
On 12 May 2021, Nouwen agreed pre-contract terms on a three-year deal with Chelsea which commits her to the club until the summer of 2024. She joined them ahead of the 2021/22 campaign.

On 10 October 2021, Nouwen made her first league start for Chelsea in a 3–0 victory against Leicester City a game in which she would play 90 minutes.

On 26 February 2022, Nouwen scored her first goal for Chelsea in a FA Cup 5th round tie against Leicester City a game in which Chelsea would go onto win 7–0.

A month later on 27 March 2022, Nouwen scored her first league goal for Chelsea once again Leicester City were the opponents a game that saw Chelsea win 9–0 away from home.

On 8 May 2022, Nouwen won her first league title as Chelsea lifted the FA WSL trophy on the final day with a 4–2 victory against Manchester United

On 15 May 2022, Nouwen lifted her second trophy with Chelsea as they defeated Manchester City to the FA Cup, Nouwen would play 69 minutes.

Loan to Milan, 2023– 
On 21 January 2023, it was announced that Nouwen had joined Italian side Milan on loan for the remainder of the 2022–23 season, While at the same time it was announced she had signed a new deal to remain at Chelsea until 2025.

International career
Nouwen played for Netherlands U17 team at the 2015 UEFA Women's Under-17 Championship qualification and at the 2016 UEFA Women's Under-17 Championship qualification. In both occasions, the Dutch team failed to qualify to the tournament's Elite round. She also played for the Netherlands U19 team at the 2017 UEFA Women's Under-19 Championship and at the 2018 UEFA Women's Under-19 Championship. In 2017, the team reached the semi-finals where they lost 3–2 to Spain. In 2018, the team was eliminated in the Group Stage due to the goal difference criteria. Nouwen played in all matches for the Netherlands in both tournaments. In 2018, Nouwen was called to represent the Netherlands U20 team at the 2018 FIFA U-20 Women's World Cup. Again, she played all of her team's matches in the tournament. The Dutch team was eliminated in quarter-finals after losing 2–1 for England.

On 4 March 2019, Nouwen made her debut for the Netherlands senior national team when she started and played 63 minutes in the 1–0 defeat for Poland. Two days later, on 6 March, she recorded her second international cap when replaced Siri Worm in the 66th minute of the match against China PR.

On 23 October 2020, Nouwen scored her first goal for the Netherlands senior national team in a 7–0 victory over Estonia which saw the side qualify for the Women's Euros in 2022. Her second came on 28 June 2022 in a 3–0 victory over Belarus in a World Cup qualifying game.

Career statistics

International

Scores and results list Netherlands' goal tally first, score column indicates score after each Nouwen goal.

Honours 
Chelsea
 FA WSL:  2021–22
 FA Cup : 2021–22

References

External links
 
 
Senior national team profile at Onsoranje.nl (in Dutch)
Under-20 national team profile at Onsoranje.nl (in Dutch)
Under-19 national team profile at Onsoranje.nl (in Dutch)
Under-17 national team profile at Onsoranje.nl (in Dutch)
Under-16 national team profile at Onsoranje.nl (in Dutch)

1999 births
Living people
Sportspeople from Helmond
Dutch women's footballers
Netherlands women's international footballers
Eredivisie (women) players
Women's association football defenders
Footballers at the 2020 Summer Olympics
Olympic footballers of the Netherlands
PSV (women) players
Chelsea F.C. Women players
A.C. Milan Women players
UEFA Women's Euro 2022 players
Footballers from North Brabant